Urvashi Butalia (born 1952) is an Indian feminist writer, publisher and activist. She is known for her work in the women's movement of India, as well as for authoring books such as The Other Side of Silence: Voices from and the Partition of India and Speaking Peace: Women's Voices from Kashmir.

Along with Ritu Menon, she co-founded Kali for Women, India's first feminist publishing house, in 1984. In 2003, she founded Zubaan Books, an imprint of Kali for Women.

In 2011, Butalia and Menon were jointly awarded the Padma Shri, India's fourth highest civilian award, for their work in Literature and Education.

Early life and education
Butalia was born in Ambala, Haryana, into a progressive and atheist family of Punjabi heritage. She is the third of four children of Subhadra and Joginder Singh Butalia. Her mother ran a counselling centre for women. Butalia has one [older] sister, Bela, and two brothers, Pankaj and Rahul. Pankaj Butalia is a left-wing documentary filmmaker best known for a documentary on the miserable conditions of widows living in Vrindavan.

Butalia earned a BA in literature from Miranda House, Delhi University, in 1971, a Master's degree in literature from Delhi University in 1973, and a Master's in South Asian Studies from the University of London in 1977. She speaks Hindi, Punjabi and Bengali, along with English, Italian and French.

Career

Butalia started her career working with Oxford University Press in Delhi. She worked for a year at their Oxford headquarters, before moving briefly to London-based Zed Books as an editor in 1982. She then returned to India and, along with Ritu Menon, set up a feminist publishing house, Kali for Women, in 1984.

Butalia engages herself in teaching at the Young India Fellowship at Ashoka University through her course on women, society and changing India.

Butalia's main areas of interest are the Partition and oral histories from a feminist and left-wing perspective. She has written on gender, communalism, fundamentalism and media. Her writings have appeared in several newspapers and magazines , including The Guardian, the New Internationalist, The Statesman, The Times of India, Outlook and India Today. She has been a regular columnist for the left-wing Tehelka and for Indian Printer and Publisher, a business-to-business (B2B) publication dealing with the print and publishing industry.

Butalia is a consultant for Oxfam India and holds the position of Reader at the College of Vocational Studies at the University of Delhi.

Kali for Women 
Kali for Women, India's first exclusively feminist publishing house, which Butalia co-founded with Ritu Menon, was set up in 1984 as a trust to increase the body of knowledge on women in the Third World, to give voice to such knowledge as already exists, and provide a forum for women writers, creative and academics.

In 2003, co-founders Butalia and Menon parted ways. Both went on to set up their own imprints under the banner of Kali for Women, with Menon establishing Women Unlimited and Butalia founding Zubaan Books.

Zubaan Books 
Originally set up as a non-profit in 2003, Zubaan now operates as the private company, Zubaan Publishers Pvt. Ltd. The independent publishing house publishes fiction and academic books, "on, for, by and about women in South Asia", with the list including renowned authors such as Jaishree Misra, Nivedita Menon, Manjula Padmanabhan, Suniti Namjoshi and Annie Zaidi.

The Other Side of Silence
Apart from several newspaper articles and op-ed pieces dealing with feminist issues, Butalia has authored or co-authored several books. The Other Side of Silence (1998), the product of more than seventy interviews conducted with survivors of the Partition, is being used as an academic text in some Indian universities. 

The Goethe Institute has described it as "one of the most influential books in South Asian studies to be published in recent decades... It emphasises the role of violence against women in the collective experience of tragedy." The Other Side of Silence won the Oral History Book Association Award in 2001 and the Nikkei Asia Prize for Culture in 2003.

Activism 
Butalia is an associate of the Women's Institute for Freedom of the Press (WIFP).

Awards and recognition 
In 2000, Butalia won the Pandora Award from Women in Publishing.

In 2011, Butalia was awarded the Padma Shri by the Government of India.

In 2017, the Goethe Institute awarded Butalia the Goethe Medal, an official decoration of the Federal Republic of Germany that "honors individuals who have displayed exceptional competence of the German language as well as in international cultural exchange."

Works

References

External links

 Zubaan Books website
 Biography as a member of the 2006 Lettre Ulysses Award jury
 Interview by Anupama Arora and Sandrine Sanos, Journal of Feminist Scholarship 6 (Spring 2014)

1952 births
20th-century Indian businesspeople
20th-century Indian businesswomen
20th-century Indian journalists
20th-century Indian women writers
21st-century Indian businesspeople
21st-century Indian businesswomen
21st-century Indian journalists
21st-century Indian women writers
21st-century Indian writers
Alumni of the University of London
Businesspeople from Haryana
Businesswomen from Haryana
English-language writers from India
Feminist studies scholars
Indian feminist writers
Indian feminists
Indian political writers
Indian publishers (people)
Indian women journalists
Indian women political writers
Indian women publishers
Journalists from Haryana
Journalists from Meghalaya
Living people
People from Ambala
Recipients of the Padma Shri in literature & education
Delhi University alumni
Women writers from Haryana
Writers from Haryana
Winners of the Nikkei Asia Prize